Kelarestaq-e Sharqi Rural District is a rural district (dehestan) in the Central District of Chalus County, Mazandaran Province, Iran. At the 2006 census, its population was 24,530, in 6,433 families. The rural district has 33 villages.

References 

Rural Districts of Mazandaran Province
Chalus County